Brooks Lake is a lake in Wright County, in the U.S. state of Minnesota.

Brooks Lake was named for a pioneer settler.

See also
List of lakes in Minnesota

References

Lakes of Minnesota
Lakes of Wright County, Minnesota